Prospectus is a live album by soprano saxophonist Steve Lacy, which was recorded in France in 1982 and first released on the hat ART label in 1983 as a double LP. The album was rereleased as a single CD with only five tracks in 1999 as Clichés.

Reception

The Allmusic review by  Scott Yanow stated "Lacy offered an alternative way to play free jazz, contrasting sound and silence and taking thoughtful and often-scalar improvisations not absent of melody and lyricism, but still quite adventurous and unpredictable. This is one of many excellent recordings of Lacy's music". Reviewing the CD reissue for All About Jazz Glenn Astarita said "Cliches is absolutely essential listening for fans of this brilliant soprano saxophonist-composer! ... the indications are that of a world class musician who along with his estimable bandmates present the jazz world with 63-minutes of music magic as Cliches is yet another noteworthy addition to Steve Lacy’s distinguished recorded legacy!".

Track listing
All compositions by Steve Lacy
 "Stamps" – 6:50
 "Wickets" – 11:30
 "The Whammies" – 5:10
 "Prospectus" – 6:00 Omitted from single CD reissue
 "The Dumps (Take 1)" – 17:10
 "Cliches" – 22:40
 "The Dumps (Take 2)" – 15:35 Omitted from single CD reissue
 "Retreat" – 7:45 Omitted from single CD reissue

Personnel
Steve Lacy – soprano saxophone, voice
George Lewis – trombone
Steve Potts – alto saxophone, soprano saxophone
Bobby Few – piano 
Irene Aebi – cello, violin, voice 
Jean-Jacques Avenel – bass 
Oliver Johnson – percussion
Cyrille Few – percussion (track 6)
Sherry Margolin – percussion (track 6)

References

Steve Lacy (saxophonist) live albums
1983 live albums
Hathut Records live albums